In human mitochondrial genetics, haplogroup B is a human mitochondrial DNA (mtDNA) haplogroup.

Origin
Haplogroup B is believed to have arisen in Asia some 50,000 years before present. Its ancestral haplogroup was haplogroup R.

The greatest variety of haplogroup B is in China. It is therefore likely that it underwent its earliest diversification in mainland East or South East Asia.

Distribution
Basal B was found in Upper Paleolithic Tianyuan man.

Haplogroup B is now most common among populations native to Southeast Asia, as well as speakers of Sino-Tibetan languages and Austronesian languages.

A subclade of B4b (which is sometimes labeled B2) is one of five haplogroups found among the indigenous peoples of the Americas, the others being A, C, D, and X.

Because the migration to the Americas by the ancestors of indigenous Americans is generally believed to have been from northeastern Siberia via Beringia, it is surprising that Haplogroup B and Haplogroup X have not been found in Paleo-Siberian tribes of northeastern Siberia. However, Haplogroup B has been found among Turkic, Mongolic, and Tungusic populations of Siberia, such as Tuvans, Altays, Shors, Khakassians, Yakuts, Buryats, Mongols, Negidals, and Evenks. This haplogroup is also found among populations in China, Indonesia, Iran, Iraq, Japan, Korea, Laos, Madagascar, Malaysia, Melanesia, Micronesia, Mongolia, the Philippines, Polynesia, Thailand, and Vietnam.

Although haplogroup B in general has been found in many Siberian population samples, the subclade that is phylogenetically closest to American B2, namely B4b1, has been found mainly in populations of southern China and Southeast Asia, especially Filipinos and Austronesian speakers of eastern Indonesia (approx. 8%) and the aborigines of Taiwan and Hainan (approx. 7%). However, B4b1 has been observed in populations as far north as Turochak and Choya districts in the north of Altai Republic (3/72 = 4.2% Tubalar), Miyazaki and Tokyo, Japan (approx. 3%), South Korea (4/185 = 2.2%), Tuva (1/95 = 1.1% Tuvan), and Hulunbuir (1/149 = 0.7% Barghut).

Table of Frequencies of MtDNA Haplogroup B

Subclades

Tree
This phylogenetic tree of haplogroup B subclades is based on the paper by Mannis van Oven and Manfred Kayser Updated comprehensive phylogenetic tree of global human mitochondrial DNA variation and subsequent published research.

B'R11'R24
B4'5 – China (Han from Zhanjiang, Paleolithic remains from Tianyuan Cave), the Philippines (Ivatan)
B4
B4-T16217C* – Vietnam (Lô Lô), Japan
B4a'g'h'i'k'm (B4-C16261T)
B4-C16261T* – Thailand (Lao Isan in Chaiyaphum Province), Cambodia (Takeo), Vietnam (Kinh), China (Han, Uyghur), Korea
B4a – Korea, Han Chinese (Denver), Tujia, Uyghur, Borneo (Bidayuh)
B4a1 (TMRCA 22,900 [95% CI 18,200 <-> 28,400] ybp)
B4a1a (TMRCA 9,700 [95% CI 9,000 <-> 10,500] ybp)
B4a1a* – Philippines (Ivatan, etc.), Malaysia, Papua New Guinea (Trobriand Islands), Ireland
B4a1a1 (A14022G, A16247G) – (TMRCA 7,000 [95% CI 6,600 <-> 7,500] ybp) Vanuatu (Port Olry), Papua New Guinea (Siwai of Bougainville) the Polynesian motif,  or "PM" (though sometimes referred to as its immediate precursor)
B4a1a1a (16247) – (TMRCA 5,400 [95% CI 4,900 <-> 5,900] ybp) Vanuatu (Banks and Torres), Cook Islands (also sometimes referred to as "the Polynesian motif")
B4a1a1a1 – Solomon Islands (Ranongga, Malaita)
B4a1a1a1a – Solomon Islands (Savo)
B4a1a1a1a1 – Solomon Islands (Gela, Isabel)
B4a1a1a1b – Solomon Islands (Gela, Simbo)
B4a1a1a1c – Papua New Guinea (Nasioi and Nagovisi of Bougainville)
B4a1a1a1d – Tonga
B4a1a1a2 – Solomon Islands (Choiseul), Papua New Guinea (Lihir Island)
B4a1a1a2a – Solomon Islands (Malaita)
B4a1a1a2b – Papua New Guinea (Buin of Bougainville)
B4a1a1a3 – Solomon Islands (Malaita, Makira)
B4a1a1a4 – Papua New Guinea (South Coast), Solomon Islands (Guadalcanal)
B4a1a1a5 – Solomon Islands (Malaita, Ontong Java)
B4a1a1a6 – Solomon Islands (Malaita, Vella Lavella)
B4a1a1a7 – Solomon Islands (Bellona)
B4a1a1a8 – Solomon Islands (Tikopia), Fiji
B4a1a1a9 – Solomon Islands (Tikopia)
B4a1a1a10 – Solomon Islands (Savo, Ranongga)
B4a1a1a11 – Solomon Islands (Simbo)
B4a1a1a11a – Solomon Islands (Choiseul), Vanuatu (Banks and Torres)
B4a1a1a11b – Solomon Islands (Bellona), Cook Islands
B4a1a1a12 – Solomon Islands (Gela, Savo)
B4a1a1a13 – Solomon Islands (Choiseul), Samoa
B4a1a1a14 – Papua New Guinea (Buka)
B4a1a1a15 – Tonga, Wallis and Futuna (Futuna)
B4a1a1a16 – Solomon Islands (Tikopia), Tonga
B4a1a1a17 – Papua New Guinea (Buka, Siwai of Bougainville)
B4a1a1a18 – Cook Islands
B4a1a1a19 – Papua New Guinea (Lihir Island, Anem of New Britain)
B4a1a1a20 – Tuvalu
B4a1a1a21 – Solomon Islands (Malaita), Samoa
B4a1a1a22 – Niue, Samoa
B4a1a1a23 – Papua New Guinea (Torau of Bougainville), Solomon Islands (Isabel, Vella Lavella, Shortlands)
B4a1a1b – Madagascar (Mikea, Merina) (Malagasy motif – a Polynesian motif found only among the Malagasy people)
B4a1a1c – Cook Islands
B4a1a1d – Solomon Islands (Isabel), Papua New Guinea (Kavieng)
B4a1a1e – Solomon Islands (Ranongga, Malaita)
B4a1a1f – Solomon Islands (Guadalcanal)
B4a1a1g – Solomon Islands (Russell, Malaita)
B4a1a1h – Solomon Islands (Bellona, Rennell)
B4a1a1i – Solomon Islands (Ranongga, Savo)
B4a1a1j – Solomon Islands (Russell, Guadalcanal)
B4a1a1k – Tonga, Samoa
B4a1a1k1 – Tonga, Samoa
B4a1a1m – Tonga, Samoa, Wallis and Futuna (Futuna)
B4a1a1m1 – Cook Islands, Tuvalu
B4a1a1n – Solomon Islands (Santa Cruz), Cook Islands
B4a1a1o – Papua New Guinea (Madang), Solomon Islands (Tikopia), Samoa
B4a1a1p – Solomon Islands (Gela)
B4a1a1q – Indonesia (West New Guinea), Solomon Islands (Choiseul)
B4a1a1r – Cook Islands
B4a1a1s – Papua New Guinea (Torau and Nagovisi of Bougainville)
B4a1a1t – Samoa, Cook Islands
B4a1a1u – Fiji, Wallis and Futuna (Futuna)
B4a1a1v – Tonga, Wallis and Futuna (Futuna)
B4a1a1w – Papua New Guinea (Anem of New Britain)
B4a1a1x – Tuvalu, Micronesia (Majuro Atoll)
B4a1a1y – Solomon Islands (Vella Lavella)
B4a1a1z – Papua New Guinea (Nakanai of New Britain)
B4a1a1aa – Bougainville (Torau, etc.)
B4a1a1ab – Solomon Islands (Ontong Java), Samoa
B4a1a1ac – Solomon Islands (Kolombangara), Tuvalu
B4a1a1ad – Wallis and Futuna (Futuna)
B4a1a1ae – Papua New Guinea (Kavieng)
B4a1a1af – Papua New Guinea (Anem of New Britain)
B4a1a2 – Taiwan (Amis)
B4a1a3 – Taiwan (Ami)
B4a1a3a – Taiwan (Siraya)
B4a1a3a1 – Philippines (Ivatan), Malaysia (Kota Kinabalu), Spain, USA
B4a1a3a1a – Taiwan (Amis)
B4a1a4 – Philippines (Ivatan), Orchid Island (Yami)
B4a1a5 – Philippines, Malaysia (Kota Kinabalu)
B4a1a5a – Philippines (Kalangoya, Ivatan)
B4a1a6 – Philippines (Kalangoya, Ifugao)
B4a1a6a – Philippines (Kalangoya, Ibaloi)
B4a1a7 – Taiwan (Amis)
B4a1b'e (TMRCA 20,000 [95% CI 15,300 <-> 25,700] ybp)
B4a1b'e* – China (Naxi, Nyingchi, etc.)
B4a1b – Japan
B4a1b1 – Japan
B4a1b1a – Japan, Korea
B4a1e – China, Taiwan (Makatao), Vietnam (Thái), Thailand (Khon Mueang in Chiang Mai Province, Lamphun Province, and Lampang Province, Tai Yuan in Northern Thailand)
B4a1c (TMRCA 20,200 [95% CI 15,600 <-> 25,700] ybp) – India, China (Uyghur), Vietnam (Tay), Japan
B4a1c1 (TMRCA 17,400 [95% CI 10,700 <-> 26,600] ybp) – Japan
B4a1c1a (TMRCA 13,800 [95% CI 8,200 <-> 21,800] ybp) – Japan, Korea, China
B4a1c1a1 – Japan, Korea
B4a1c2'4'5 (TMRCA 17,100 [95% CI 11,800 <-> 23,900] ybp) – Vietnam (Cờ Lao)
B4a1c2 – Tuvan, Tofalar
B4a1c4 (TMRCA 13,400 [95% CI 11,000 <-> 16,300] ybp) – China (Mongol in Hulun Buir, Dai), Vietnam (Dao, Hà Nhì, Si La, Kinh, Nùng), Thailand (Khon Mueang in Chiang Mai Province, Phutai in Sakon Nakhon Province, Nyaw in Nakhon Phanom Province, Lao Isan in four provinces of Northeast Thailand, Shan in Mae Hong Son Province, Htin in Phayao Province, Phuan in Suphan Buri Province)
B4a1c5 – China (Fujian), Taiwan (Hakka)
B4a1c3 (TMRCA 16,100 [95% CI 10,100 <-> 24,500] ybp)
B4a1c3a (TMRCA 3,600 [95% CI 1,650 <-> 6,800] ybp) – Japan, Korea, Kazakh (Zhan Aul of Altai Republic), Kyrgyz (Kyrgyzstan)
B4a1c3b (TMRCA 11,500 [95% CI 5,600 <-> 21,200] ybp) – Japan, Korea, China
B4a1d – Vietnam
B4a2 – Japan
B4a2a – Indonesia (Semende of Sumatra, Banjarmasin), Philippines, Taiwan (Makatao, Hakka)
B4a2a1 – Orchid Island (Yami), Philippines (Ivatan)
B4a2a2 – Taiwan (Atayal, Saisiat)
B4a2a3 – Taiwan (Paiwan, Hakka)
B4a2b – China (Han from Beijing)
B4a2b1 – China, Jamaica
B4a2b1a – Japan
B4a3 – Tibet (Nagqu), Japan
B4a4 – Ladakh, Northern Areas of Pakistan (Balti), Singapore, China (Han from Beijing, etc.), Korea, Russia, Germany
B4a4a - Yakut, Yukaghir
B4a4b - China
B4a4c - Thailand
B4a4c1 - Naxi, Uyghur
B4a4d - China
B4a4e - China
B4a4e1 - China, Taiwan
B4a4f - Japan
B4a4f1 - China
B4a5 – China (Han), Taiwan (Hakka), Vietnam (H'Mông, Dao, Cờ Lao)
B4g
B4g1 – Thailand
B4g1a – Thailand (Khon Mueang in Mae Hong Son, Chiang Rai, and Lampang provinces, Phutai in Sakon Nakhon Province), Vietnam (Thái, Nùng, etc.), China (Han from Zhanjiang, etc.)
B4g1b – Han Chinese (Beijing, Denver)
B4g2 – Orchid Island (Tao), China (Han from Hunan), Vietnam (Cờ Lao, Dao, Si La), Thailand (Tai Dam in Kanchanaburi Province, Phutai in Sakon Nakhon Province, Lao Isan in Chaiyaphum Province, Htin in Phayao Province)
B4h – China, Taiwan, Vietnam, Thailand (Phuan in Sukhothai Province)
B4h1 – China (Fujian, etc.), Taiwan, Thailand (Tai Dam in Kanchanaburi Province), Japan
B4i – China
B4i1 – China (Han from Beijing, etc.)
B4k – China (Han from Beijing, etc.)
B4m – Korea, China, Taiwan (Minnan), Vietnam
B4b'd'e'j – Vietnam, Laos
B4b – Canada
B2 – Quechua, Guarani, Coreguaje, Waunana, Katuena, Ache, Gaviao, Xavante, Peru, Ecuador, Colombia, Argentina, USA (Yaqui, Hispanics, etc.), Dominican Republic
B2a – Northwestern Canada (Tsimshian), Mexico (Chihuahua)
B2a1 – USA (Jemez in New Mexico, Hispanics, etc.), Mexico
B2a1a – USA (Hispanics)
B2a1a1 – Mexico (Chihuahua)
B2a1b – Mexico (Chihuahua), USA (Hispanic)
B2a2 – USA (New Mexico, Colorado, Mexican)
B2a3 – Mexico (Chihuahua, Durango), USA (Mexican)
B2a4
B2a4a – Mexico (Sinaloa)
B2a4a1 – Mexico (Chihuahua, Jalisco, Durango)
B2a5 – Pima, USA (Arizona, Utah, California)
B2b – Cayapa, Pomo, Xavante, Colombia, Peru, Ecuador, Argentina
B2b1 – Venezuela, Ecuador (Shuar of Gualaceo)
B2b2 – Bolivia (Beni), Argentina (Criollo of Gran Chaco), USA (Hispanic)
B2b2a – Bolivia (Santa Cruz, Cochabamba)
B2b3 – Yanomama
B2b3a – Puerto Rico, Venezuela, Kayapo
B2b4 – USA (Mexican)
B2c – Ecuador, USA (Hispanic), ancient Canada
B2c1 – Mexico (Mixe), USA (Hispanic, Mexican)
B2c1a – USA (Mexican, Hispanic)
B2c1b – USA (Hispanic, Mexican)
B2c1c – USA (Mexican)
B2c2 – USA (Mexican)
B2c2a – USA (Mexican, Hispanic)
B2c2b – USA (Mexican, Hispanic)
B2d – Nicaragua (Chinandega), Ngöbe/Guaymi, Wayuu, Colombia, USA (Hispanic in New Jersey)
B2e – Colombia, Argentina, Waiwai
B2f – USA (Mexican)
B2g
B2g1 – Mexico, USA (Yaqui, Mexican, Hispanic)
B2g2
B2h – Ache
B2i
B2i1 – Kayapo
B2i2 – Chile
B2i2a – Mapuche
B2i2a1 – Chile
B2i2a1a – Chile, Argentina
B2i2a1b – Chile
B2i2b – Chile
B2i2b1 – Chile
B2j
B2k – Venezuela, USA (Mexican)
B2l – Venezuela, Ecuador
B2m
B2n
B2o – Colombia, Mexico (Maya), USA (Hispanic in Arizona)
B2o1 – Ecuador, Bolivia
B2o1a – Colombia, Bolivia, Peru
B2p – USA (Mexican)
B2q – Ecuador, USA (Mexican)
B2r – USA (Hispanic, Mexican)
B2s – USA (Mexican)
B2t – Guatemala (Maya, la Tinta)
B2u
B2v
B2w
B2x
B2y – South America (Andes), Peru
B2y1 – USA
B4b1
B4b1* – Thailand (Phuan in Phrae Province), Korea, Japan
B4b1a 
B4b1a* – China, Tubalar, Philippines, Indonesia
B4b1a-G207A (TMRCA 14,900 [95% CI 11,200 <-> 19,400] ybp) – Japan
B4b1a1 (TMRCA 3,000 [95% CI 2,100 <-> 4,200] ybp) – Japan
B4b1a1a – Japan, Korea
B4b1a1b – Japan
B4b1a1c – Japan, Korea
B4b1a2 (TMRCA 11,900 [95% CI 10,300 <-> 13,600] ybp) – Japan, Korea, China (Fujian), Taiwan, Philippines (Aeta of Bataan, etc.), Indonesia, Thailand (Khon Mueang in Lampang Province), India
B4b1a2a – Thailand (Khon Mueang in Chiang Mai, Lamphun, and Lampang provinces, Phutai in Sakon Nakhon Province, Tai Dam in Loei Province, Lao Isan in Ubon Ratchathani Province), Vietnam (Gelao), China (Han from Zhanjiang), Korea, Japan
B4b1a2b – Taiwan (Ami)
B4b1a2b1 – Philippines (Maranao, Manobo)
B4b1a2b2 – Taiwan (Bunun, Makatao)
B4b1a2c – Philippines (Mamanwa)
B4b1a2d – Philippines (Surigaonon)
B4b1a2e – China (She people, etc.)
B4b1a2f – Taiwan (Bunun, Tsou)
B4b1a2g – Taiwan (Bunun)
B4b1a2g1 – Taiwan (Bunun)
B4b1a2h – Taiwan (Ami)
B4b1a2i
B4b1a2i* – Tuvalu, Banjar (Banjarmasin)
B4b1a2i1
B4b1a2i1*
B4b1a2i1a
B4b1a2i1a* – Nauru, Kiribati
B4b1a2i1a1 – Tuvalu
B4b1a2i2 – Solomon Islands (Guadalcanal)
B4b1a3 (TMRCA 7,300 [95% CI 4,600 <-> 11,000] ybp) – Han Chinese (Denver)
B4b1a3* – Hazara (Pakistan)
B4b1a3a (TMRCA 3,300 [95% CI 2,100 <-> 4,900] ybp)
B4b1a3a* – Turk, Altai Kizhi, Shor, Uyghur, Yakut
B4b1a3a1 – Khamnigan, Buryat, Barghut
B4b1a3a2 – Khamnigan
B4b1a3a3 – Chuvash
B4b1a3b
B4b1a3b* – Buryat
B4b1a3b1 – Uyghur
B4b1b'c
B4b1b – Japan, Korean, China (Lanzhou), Vietnam
B4b1c – China, Taiwan, South Korea, Japan (TMRCA 14,900 [95% CI 9,800 <-> 21,700] ybp)
B4b1c1 – Vietnam (Kinh, Tày, Nùng), Thailand, China, Japan (TMRCA 7,200 [95% CI 4,500 <-> 10.800] ybp)
B4b1c2 – Mongol (New Barag Left Banner), China, Taiwan (Hakka), Japan (TMRCA 12,900 [95% CI 7,800 <-> 20,100] ybp)
B4d
B4d1'2'3
B4d1'2'3* – Russia (Buryat), China (Oroqen, Tibetan from Tingri, etc.), Korea
B4d1 – China (Miao, Han from Fengcheng, Lanzhou, Jiangsu, etc.), Taiwan, Japan (Chiba), conqueror period Hungary (three specimens from the Karos-III site)  
B4d1a – Han Chinese (Denver), Barghut (Hulun Buir)
B4d2 – China (Han from Qingdao)
B4d3 – China (Han from Beijing, etc.)
B4d3a – China, Italy (TMRCA 8,300 [95% CI 4,700 <-> 13,500] ybp)
B4d3a1 – Japan (Aichi, Ibaraki, etc.), Korea
B4d4 – Japan (Chiba, etc.)
B4e – Thailand (Phuan in Lopburi, Sukhothai, and Phrae provinces, Tai Yuan in Uttaradit Province), Laos (Lao in Vientiane), Vietnam (La Hủ), China, Japan (Tokyo)
B4j – Buryat, Khamnigan
B4c – Thailand, Indonesia
B4c1
B4c1a'b
B4c1a – China (Shandong, Lanzhou, Deng people, Sarikoli in Tashkurgan), Vietnam (La Hủ) (TMRCA 18,000 [95% CI 12,600 <-> 25,000] ybp)
B4c1a1 – Japan (Tokyo, Aichi) (TMRCA 12,000 [95% CI 8,300 <-> 16,700] ybp)
B4c1a1a – Japan (Chiba, Aichi), Korea
B4c1a1a1 – Japan (Tokyo), Korea
B4c1a1a1a – Japan (Aichi, etc.)
B4c1a1a2 – Japan (Aichi)
B4c1a1b – Japan (Tokyo, etc.), Korea
B4c1a1c – Japan (Tokyo, etc.)
B4c1a2 – Barghut, Buryat, Yakut (TMRCA 11,700 [95% CI 6,000 <-> 20,600] ybp)
B4c1a2a – Barghut (Hulun Buir), Khamnigan, Kyrgyz (Artux) (TMRCA 3,200 [95% CI 700 <-> 9,300] ybp)
B4c1b - Japan (Aichi), Vietnam (Kinh), Thailand
B4c1b1
B4c1b1* – Japan (Tokyo), Korea, USA
B4c1b1a – Japan (Tokyo)
B4c1b-A16335G
B4c1b-C5246A/T14502C/G16310A
B4c1b-C5246A/T14502C/G16310A* – Vietnam (Tay, Kinh)
B4c1b-C2380T
B4c1b-C2380T* – Japan (Chiba)
B4c1b-A200G/G16145A/C16189TC – Uyghur
B4c1b2 - Poland
B4c1b2a – Thailand (Khon Mueang in Lampang Province), China (Han from Fengcheng, Lanzhou, etc.), Kazakh (Altai)
B4c1b2a1 – China (Zhejiang, etc.), Uyghur, Japan
B4c1b2a2 – Indonesia (Besemah of Sumatra), Philippines (Ivatan), South Africa, China
B4c1b2a2a – Philippines (Ivatan), Orchid Island (Yami)
B4c1b2a2b – Philippines (Ivatan)
B4c1b2b – Taiwan (Minnan), Han Chinese (Denver)
B4c1b2c – China, Han Chinese (Denver), Taiwan, Vietnam (Phù Lá, Tay), Cambodia (Siem Reap), Laos (Lao in Vientiane), Hazara (Pakistan)
B4c1b2c1 – China (Han from Beijing), Taiwan (Minnan), Japan
B4c1b2c2 – China, Taiwan (Hakka, etc.), Vietnam (Kinh, La Hủ), Thailand (Khon Mueang in Chiang Mai Province)
B4c1b3
B4c1b3* – Japan (Aichi)
B4c1b3a – Northern Thailand (Khon Mueang in Chiang Mai Province and Lamphun Province)
B4c1c
B4c1c* – China, Korea, Japan
B4c1c-T16311C!
B4c1c-T16311C!* – China, Japan
B4c1c1 – Japan, Korea, Singapore, Kyrgyzstan
B4c1c1a – Japan, Korea
B4c1c1b - Japan
B4c2
B4c2* – Thailand (Tai Lü in Northern Thailand, Thai in Western Thailand, Phuan in Phichit, Lopburi, and Sukhothai provinces, Lao Isan in Ubon Ratchathani Province, Saek in Nakhon Phanom Province, Soa in Sakon Nakhon Province), Laos (Lao in Luang Prabang), Indonesia (Banjar of Banjarmasin, Besemah of Sumatra, Jawa Timur), USA ("Caucasian"), Vietnam (La Hủ, Hà Nhì), Cambodia (Siem Reap, Battambang, Banteay Meanchey)
B4c2a
B4c2a* – Thai
B4c2a1 – Uzbek, Uyghur, China
B4c2b – Vietnam (Cham), Cambodia (Kampong Thom), Malaysia (Seletar), Indonesia (Banjar from Banjarmasin), Netherlands
B4c2c – Thailand (Thai in Eastern Thailand, Tai Khün in Northern Thailand, Tai Lü in Northern Thailand), Laos (Lao from Luang Prabang), Cambodia (Kampong Thom), Vietnam (Tày, Nùng, Dao), Taiwan (Minnan), China (Tu, etc.)
B4c2d – Cambodia (Kampong Thom, Kratié)
B4c2e – Vietnam (La Hu)
B4c2f – Vietnam (Kinh), Thailand (Phuan)
B4c2g – Thailand (Phuan)
B4c3
B4c3* – China
B4c3a
B4c3a* – Vietnam (La Chí)
B4c3a1 – Vietnam (La Chí)
B4c3b – Vietnam (Lô Lô)
B4c3c – Vietnam (La Hủ)
B4f – Japan (Japanese, Ryukyuan, Ainu, late 3–4th century AD (early Kofun period) Yokohama)
B4f* – Vietnam (Lô Lô), Japan (Aichi)
B4f1 - Barghut, Korea
B4f1* – Japan (Tokyo)
B4f1a – Japan (Tokyo, etc.)
B5
B5* – China
B5a – Thailand (Tai Dam from Kanchanaburi Province), Vietnam (Kinh), China (Han), Taiwan (Hakka), Philippines (Agta of Iriga)
B5a1 – Thailand (Tai Yuan from Ratchaburi Province, Blang from Chiang Rai Province, Lao Isan from Chaiyaphum Province, Nyaw from Nakhon Phanom Province, Tai Dam from Kanchanaburi Province, Phuan from Sukhothai Province, Soa from Sakon Nakhon Province), Indonesia (Besemah of Sumatra), Vietnam, China
B5a1a – Cambodia, Vietnam (Kinh, Gelao), Laos, Thailand, Indonesia (Besemah and Kutaradja of Sumatra), China, Uyghur, Taiwan (Minnan), Philippines, India
B5a1a1 – Nicobar Islands
B5a1b – China (Han from Wuhan), Philippines, Iran
B5a1b1 – Cambodia (Jarai), Indonesia, Philippines, Taiwan, Thailand (Bru from Sakon Nakhon Province, Phuan from Sukhothai Province and Lopburi Province, Tai Yuan from Uttaradit Province, Khon Mueang from Mae Hong Son Province and Chiang Mai Province, Tai Dam from Kanchanaburi Province, Soa from Sakon Nakhon Province, Nyaw from Nakhon Phanom Province, Saek from Nakhon Phanom Province), Laos (Lao from Luang Prabang and Vientiane), China, Korea
B5a1c – China, Taiwan (Minnan), Thailand (Kaleun from Nakhon Phanom Province), Guyana
B5a1c1 – China, Taiwan (Minnan), Laos (Lao from Luang Prabang)
B5a1c1a – Han Chinese
B5a1c1a1 – China (Han from Hunan, etc.)
B5a1c2 – China (Han)
B5a1d – China, Thailand, Laos, Cambodia, Indonesia (Semende of Sumatra)
B5a2 – China (Han from Hunan)
B5a2a
B5a2a1
B5a2a1a – China
B5a2a1b – Korea, Japan (Tokyo, Chiba)
B5a2a2
B5a2a2* – China
B5a2a2a
B5a2a2a1 – Taiwan (Paiwan, Rukai)
B5a2a2a2 – Taiwan (Saisiyat, Rukai)
B5a2a2b
B5a2a2b1 – Philippines (Ivatan)
B5a2a2b1a – Taiwan (Bunun)
B5a2a2b2 – Taiwan (Makatao)
B5b – Korea, China, Uyghur, Kyrgyz
B5b1 – China, Tibet, Buryat (Inner Mongolia), Korea, Japan (Tokyo, etc.), Thailand (Suay from Surin Province), Cambodia (Lao), Vietnam, Singapore
B5b1a – China, Thailand (Shan from Mae Hong Son Province)
B5b1a1 – Japan (Tokyo, Aichi)
B5b1a2 – Japan (Tokyo)
B5b1a2a – Japan (Chiba, Tokyo)
B5b1c – Philippines (Ivatan, etc.), Solomon Islands (Isabel, Santa Cruz), Malaysia (Jawa, Batek), Singapore, Yemen
B5b1c1 – Philippines (Kalangoya, Ifugao, Ibaloi, Kankanaey)
B5b1c1a – Philippines (Kankanaey, Ifugao, Kalangoya, Ibaloi, Abaknon)
B5b2 – Russia (Russian old settler in Pokhosk Village of Sakha Republic, Ulchi, Altaian Kazakh), China (Han, Uyghur, Barghut), Japan, Philippines
B5b2a – Negidal, Khamnigan
B5b2a1 – Japan (Aichi, Tokyo, etc.), China (Han from Wuhan)
B5b2a2 – Japan (Tokyo, etc.), Korea, China (Tianjin), Buryat, Hezhen
B5b2a2a
B5b2a2a1 – Japan (Tokyo, Chiba, Aichi)
B5b2a2a2 – Malaysia (Bidayuh of Sarawak), Philippines, Solomon Islands (Ranongga)
B5b2b – Yakut
B5b2-C204T! - China (Han), Korea, Vietnam (Kinh)
B5b2c – Taiwan (Minnan, Makatao)
B5b2c1 – China (Han from Hunan), Japan (Chiba, Aichi)
B5b3
B5b3a – Japan (Aichi, early 11th century AD (Heian period) Yokohama, etc.), Korea, China
B5b3b – Japan
B5b4 – China, Altai Kizhi
B5b5 – Taiwan (Hakka), Han Chinese (Denver)
R11'B6
R11 – China (Han from Beijing)
R11a – Japan, China
R11b – China (Han from Qingdao, etc.), Tibet (Tingri), Korea, Japan
R11b1 – China (Han from Hunan)  
R11b1c - Altai Kizhi
R11b2 - China, Xibo
R11b2a - China, Thailand (Khmer from Surin Province), Vietnam (Kinh)
R11b3 - China (Taihang area in Henan province)
R11b4 - China (Han from Chongqing)
B6
B6a – China (Han from Tai'an), Thailand (Htin in Phayao Province, Palaung and Khon Mueang in Chiang Mai Province, Phuan in Phrae Province and Sukhothai Province, Mon in Ratchaburi Province and Lopburi Province, Tai Dam in Kanchanaburi Province)
B6a1 – China, Thailand (Khon Mueang in Lampang Province, Htin in Phayao Province, Blang in Chiang Rai Province), Philippines
B6a1a – Myanmar, Thailand (Lawa and Shan in Mae Hong Son Province, Khon Mueang in Chiang Mai Province), Malaysia (Temuan)
R24 – Philippines (Mamanwa)
R24a – Philippines

Popular culture
In his popular book The Seven Daughters of Eve, Bryan Sykes named the originator of this mtDNA haplogroup Ina.

See also

Genealogical DNA test
Genetic genealogy
Human mitochondrial genetics
Population genetics
Indigenous Amerindian genetics

References

External links
General
Ian Logan's Mitochondrial DNA Site
Mannis van Oven's Phylotree
Haplogroup B
Spread of Haplogroup B, from National Geographic
Ina
Tianyuan, mtDNA B and the formation of Far Eastern peoples

B